Alexander George Karczmar (May 9, 1917 – August 17, 2017), was a Polish-American neuroscientist and academic. He was tenured for 30 years (1956–1986) as professor and chairman of the Department of Pharmacology and Experimental Therapeutics at Loyola University of Chicago Medical Center, and director of its Institute for Mind, Drugs and Behavior.

He is widely recognized for his experimental research, almost all of which is devoted to the cholinergic system, both central and peripheral, and its autonomic and mental functions, including its control of various human and animal behaviors. From the 1970s he explored the existence and the nature of the "self".

Early life
Karczmar was born on May 9, 1917, in Warsaw, Poland. His parents were Stanislas (Szmaya) Karczmar, a businessman, and Helena (Hendla) Karczmar-Billauer. He received his primary education at Collegium High School, Warsaw, from which he graduated in 1934. His subsequent studies in biological and medical sciences at the Józef Piłsudski University of Warsaw were interrupted temporarily by several anti-Semitic outbursts and ultimately, in 1939, by World War II.

Karczmar was naturalized as an American citizen in January 1946. After his emigration to the United States, he entered Columbia University, New York, Graduate School, where he earned his M.A. degree in zoology in 1941 and his Ph.D. degree in biophysics in 1947, his doctoral mentor being biophysicist and explorer of the quantal nature of vision, Professor Selig Hecht. During this time period he was also a Columbia University teaching fellow and he worked as an American Philosophical Society doctoral fellow on limb regeneration with Professor Oscar E. Schotte, of Amherst College, Massachusetts, and on neuromyal relaxation latency with Professor Alexander Sandow of New York University.

Professional career
Upon his graduation, he was successively (1946–1953) assistant and associate professor at Georgetown University, Washington, D.C., in the Department of Pharmacology and Therapeutics. There, Professor Koppanyi introduced him to the cholinergic field. He became a fellow at Sterling Winthrop Research Institute, Rensselaer, New York from 1953 to 1956, where he was a member of a team which developed Ambenonium (Mytelase), a drug still used in the treatment of myasthenia gravis, and the vasodilator amotriphene (Myordil).

In 1956, Karczmar moved to Loyola University Medical Center in Maywood, Illinois, where he served from 1956 to 1986 as professor and chairman of the Department of Pharmacology and Experimental Therapeutics, and as the senior director of the Institute for Mind, Drugs and Behavior from 1964 to 1986; he was also associate dean for research and graduate education from 1981 to 1986. He was acting medical director of Foundation 41, in Sydney, Australia, from 1988 to 1989. He also served from 1956 to 2008 as senior consultant, Research Services, VA and as consultant to the Surgeon General, US (1987-). At present he is a trustee and secretary of the Chicago Association for Research and Education in Science (1987-).

Karczmar organized many international symposia, including the Symposium on Brain and Human Behavior in Chicago, 1978 (with Sir John C. Eccles); Symposium on Interdependence of Neurotransmitter Systems in the CNS at the Seventh International Congress of Pharmacology (IUPHAR). Paris, 1978 (with J. Glowinski); Symposium on Inter-relationships Between Various Neurotransmitter Systems at the Tenth Congress of the Collegium Intern. Neuropsychopharmacologicum, Quebec, Canada, 1978; International Symposium on Aggressive Behavior, Florence, 1969 (with S. A. Barnett and S. Garattini); Symposium on Cholinergic Transmission, Annual FASEB Meeting, Atlantic City, New Jersey, 1969; and Symposium on New Conceptual Approaches to Prophylaxis and Therapy of Organophosphorus Poisoning, Fort St. Lucie, Florida, 1984.

He maintained his connection with the International Symposia on Cholinergic Mechanisms (1970–2016); he attended most of the fifteen ISCMs and served as the chair of the International Advisory Committee for several of them.

Recognitions and honors
Karczmar received a Guggenheim Fellowship for his studies on paradoxical sleep with Dr. Vicenzo Longo in the Istituto Superiore di Sanita, Rome, and the Senior Fulbright Fellowship for his work on ontogenetic effects of anticholinesterases in primates with Dr. William McBride at Foundation 41 of Sydney, Australia. He was a member of the IBRO Workshop in Warsaw, Poland (1963). He was a charter fellow of the Sherringtonian Society (1969-) and founding member of the American College of Neuropsychopharmacology.

He received many commendations and awards, including the VA Merit Citation (2002), City of Milano Medal (1969) and Award for Distinguished Scientific Achievement from the Council of the International Symposia for Cholinergic Mechanisms (2008). He is an honorary professor at Kurume University, Kurume, Japan; visiting professor at Université Laval, Quebec; visiting professor at Polish Academy of Sciences; visiting professor at INSERM, Paris; professorial lecturer at Actualites Pharmacologiques; and Carl F. Schmidt Honorary Lecturer at the University of Pennsylvania, Philadelphia.

He was a member of several NIH Study Sections, Illinois Krebiozen Committee, Toxicology Committee of the United States National Academy of Sciences and he is recipient of a Festschrift on neurobiology of acetylcholine, 1985. He was a member of editorial boards of scientific journals and magazines, including Journal of Pharmacology and Experimental Therapeutics, Neuropharmacology, European Journal of Pharmacology, Archives Internationales de Pharmacodynamie et de Thérapie, etc.

Scientific achievements
Karczmar published some 400 research papers, reviews and book chapters. He authored, co-authored or edited 7 books. His text, Exploring the Vertebrate Central Cholinergic Nervous System (Springer, New York, 2007) reviews the past and the present status of central cholinergicity, its physiology, pharmacology and biochemistry, its ontogeny and phylogenesis, and its role in functions, behaviors (including cognition), the "self" and such disease states as schizophrenia and Alzheimer's Disease; also, this text describes his own studies of these subjects.

In the 1940s Karczmar proposed the existence of a nerve growth factor on the basis of his demonstration of the quantitative effects of partial ablations of the urodele limb innervations on their post-amputation regeneration (Karczmar, 1946).
Beginning in the 1940s Karczmar pioneered the studies of anticholinesterase agents (antiChe's), discovering (with Theodore Koppanyi; see Koppanyi and Karczmar, 1951) the direct synaptic effects of organophosphorus (OP) antiChEs which are independent of their enzymic block, their morphogenetic (teratologic) effects and their postnatal behavioral actions resulting from their prenatal application. He also demonstrated that the OP antiChe's damage the blood–brain barrier. These studies contributed to the understanding of the role of cholinesterases as morphogens and "transport" or "scavenger" enzymes (Karczmar et al., 1951).

This research led Karczmar to conceptualize on the pre-neurogenetic appearance of components of the cholinergic system, their non-parallel ontogenesis and its significance, and their omni-existent phylogenesis which is independent of the presence of innervation or motility.

Karczmar and Steve Thesleff demonstrated in the 1950s the phenomenon of desensitization (receptor inactivation) at the neuromyal junction, and Karczmar described the reciprocal process, sensitization which is inducible by several drugs such as oxamides and NaF, and which, today, is ascribed to an allosteric receptor change. Karczmar pioneered also the studies of the structural nature of central cholinergic receptors by demonstrating the structural similarity between peripheral and central muscarinic receptors.

With Kyozo Koketsu, Syogoro Nishi and Nae Dun Karczmar identified in the 1950s and 1960s the three ganglionic receptor sites (nicotinic, muscarinic and peptidergic) and their potentials; they described their ionic mechanisms and the contribution of second messengers to ganglionic transmission.

Since the 1960s, Karczmar contributed to establishing the pre-eminent role of the central cholinergic system in functions such as respiration, behaviors such as aggression, perceptions such as nociception, learning, addiction, obsession and fixation, and sexual and motor activity, and in phenomena such as seizures, EEG rhythms, paradoxical sleep, and behavioral and EEG alerting; and he and his associates provided early neurochemical evidence for the interaction between the cholinergic and other transmitter systems.

Karczmar demonstrated that cholinergic agonists counteract the behavior exhibited in animal models of schizophrenia; on this basis and on the basis of other cholinergic behavioral and EEG actions Karczmar proposed that the cholinergic system contributes significantly to alertness, cognitive behavior and to the animal's (and human) "realistic" appraisal of the environment; he named the pertinent syndrome the "Cholinergic Alert Non-mobile Behavior".

Since the 1970s Karczmar explored the "self" (the "I", the self-awareness, the self-consciousness); he traced the concept of the body-mind relation to the earliest history of mankind, millennia before the advent of Descartes' dualism. He stressed the need to differentiate the "self" from cognition and perception. While he is a reductionist, he suggests that the current neuroscientific and quantal stage of knowledge is insufficient to yield an intelligible and parsimonious explanation of the "I", and he speculates that with the future success of Einstein's quest for the single equation for all the forces of the universe the nature of "I" will become explainable, perhaps via multidimensional string theory.

Later life and death

Karczmar was latterly professor emeritus of pharmacology at the Stritch School of Medicine. He died in Chicago at the age of 100 on August 17, 2017.

Publications
 Glisson, S. N., Karczmar, A. G. and Barnes, L. 1972. Cholinergic effects on adrenergic neurotransmitters in rabbit brain parts. Neuropharmacology 11: 465-477.
 Karczmar, A. G. 1946. The role of amputation and nerve resection in the regressing limbs of urodele larvae. J. Exper. Zool. 11013: 401-426.
 Karczmar, A. G. 1957. Antagonisms between a bis-quaternary oxamide, WIN 8078, and depolarizing and competitive blocking agents. J. Pharmacol. Exper. Therap. 119: 49-47.
 Karczmar, A. G. 1963a. Ontogenesis of cholinesterases. In: Cholinesterases and Anticholinesterase Agents, G. B. Koelle, Ed., pp. 129 – 186, Handbch. d. Exper Pharmakol., Erganzungswk., vol. 15, Berlin: Springer-Verlag, Berlin.
 Karczmar, A. G. 1963b. Ontogenetic effects. In: Cholinesterases and Anticholinesterase Agents, G. B. Koelle, Ed., pp. 799 –832, Handbch. d. Exper. Pharmakol., Erganzungswk., vol. 15, Berlin: Springer-Verlag.
 Karczmar, A. G. 1972. What we know, will know in the future, and possibly cannot ever know in neurosciences. In: Brain and Human Behavior, ed.. A. G. Karczmar and J. C. Eccles.1 - 20, New York: Springer-Verlag.
 Karczmar, A. G. 1973. Neurochemical and behavioral bases of ethological aggression. Psychopharmacol. Bull. 9: 16-17, 1973.
 Karczmar, A. G. 1974. Brain acetylcholine and seizures. In: Psychobiology of Convulsive Therapy, M. Fink, S. Kety, J. McGaugh and T. A. Willimas, Eds., pp. 251–270, New York: Wiley and Sons.
 Karczmar, A. G. 2007. Exploring the Vertebrate Central Cholinergic Nervous System. Springer, New York.
 Karczmar, A. G. 2009. Do all human functions and behaviors, as well as the "self" have cholinergic correlates? J. Molec NBeurosci., in Press.
 Karczmar, A. G. 1979. Brain acetylcholine and animal electrophysiology. In: Brain Acetylcholine and Neuropsychiatric Disease, K. L. Davis and P. A. Berger, Eds., pp. 265–310, New York, Plenum Press.
 Karczmar, A. G. and Howard, J. W. 1955. Antagonism of d-tubocurarine and other pharmacological properties of certain bis-quaternary salts of basically substituted oxamides WIN 8077 and analogs. J. Pharmacol. Exper. Therap. 113: 30.
 Karczmar, A. G. and Koehn, G. L. 1980. Cholinergic control of hypokinesia. Prog. Clin. Biol. Res. 39: 374.
 Karczmar, A. G. and Long, J. P. 1958. Relationship between peripheral cholinolytic potency and tetraethylpyrophsphate antagonism of a series of atropine substitutes. J. Pharmacol. Exper. Therap. 123: 230 - 237.
 Karczmar, A. G., Koketsu, K. and Nishi, S., Eds. 1986. Autonomic and Enteric Ganglia. New York: Plenum Press.
 Karczmar, A. G., Koppanyi, T. and Sheatz, G. C. 1951. Studies on intravenously injected tru cholinesterase. J. Pahrmacol. Exp. Tehrap. 102: 103 -111.
 Karczmar, A. G. and Richardson, D. L. 1985. Cholinergic mechanisms, schizophrenia, and neuropsychiatric adaptive dysfunctions. In: Central Cholinergic Mechanisms and Adaptive Dysfunctions, M. M. Singh, D. M. Warburton and H. H. Lal, Eds., pp. 193 –221, New York: Plenum Press.
 Karczmar, A. G. and Scudder, C. L. 1969a. Learning and effects of drugs on learning of related mice genera and strains. In: Neurophysiology and Behavioral Aspects of Psychotropic Drugs, W. Koella and A. G. Karczmar, Eds., pp. 132–160, Springfield, Ill.: C. C. Thomas.
 Karczmar, A. G. and Scudder, C. L. 1969b. Aggression and neurochemical changes in different strains and genera of mice. In: Aggressive Behavior, S. Garattini and E. B. Sigg, pp. 209–207, New York, John Wiley & Sons.
 Karczmar, A. G., Scudder, C. L. and Kahn, A. J. 1978. Behavioral, genetic and neurochemical aspects of alcohol preference of mice. In: Neuro-Psychopharmacology, Proc. Of the Tenth Congress of Col. Internat. Neuro-Psychopharmacologicum, P. Deniker, C. Radouco-Thomas and A. Villeneuve, Eds., pp. 799–816, Paris: Pergamon Press.
 Koehn, G. L., Henderson, G. and Karczmar, A. G. 1980. Diisopropyl phosphofluoridate-induced antinociception: possible role of endogenous opioids. European J. Pharmacol. 61: 1617-173.
 Koppanyi, T. and Karczmar, A. G. 1951. Contribution to the study of the mechanism of action of cholinesterase inhibitors. J. Pharmacol. Exp. Therap. 101: 327-343.
 Scudder, C. L. and Karczmar, A. G. 1966. Histochemical studies of cholinesterases in Ciona intestinalis. Comp. Biochem. Physiol. 17: 553-558.

References

1917 births
2017 deaths
American centenarians
American neuroscientists
American people of Polish-Jewish descent
Columbia Graduate School of Arts and Sciences alumni
Loyola University Chicago faculty
Men centenarians
Polish centenarians
Polish emigrants to the United States